Kattagaram may refer to any of the following villages in Ariyalur district, Tamil Nadu, India:

 Kattagaram (North)
 Kattagaram (South)